The down jacket, known more commonly in the fashion industry as a puffer jacket or simply puffer, is a quilted coat which is insulated with either duck or goose feathers. Air pockets created by the bulk of the feathers allow for the retention of warm air.

Fashion history 
George Finch, an Australian chemist and mountaineer, is credited with first wearing a version of the down jacket in 1922, originally made from balloon fabric and eiderdown. In 1936, outdoor adventurer Eddie Bauer created a down jacket following a hazardous fishing trip during which Bauer almost died of hypothermia; the adventurer invented an outer jacket encased with feathers, originally sold as the "skyliner". An efficient insulator, the outer garment allowed for the trapping and retention of warm air, making it a very popular choice for those enduring harsh winter conditions. Bauer was first to create, sell and patent his design in 1939. In 1937 designer Charles James developed a jacket with a similar design for haute couture. James's jacket was made of white satin yet maintained a similar, quilted design; he labelled his creation the "pneumatic jacket". James' design proved hard to replicate and thick padding throughout the interior of the coat made upper-body mobility difficult. The designer believed his contribution would be minor. This error was remedied shortly after by reducing padding around the neck and armholes. 

Following its debut, the down jacket remained popular within winter outdoor sports communities for a decade. The puffer would begin to  serve more than its utilitarian purpose in the 1940s, when it was tailored and marketed to the wealthy as an evening layer.  The garment was reimagined in the 1970s as an athleisure jacket specifically marketed towards women by designer Norma Kamali. Named the "sleeping bag jacket", Kamali's version featured two coats sewn together with a synthetic down alternative packed between. Within the last couple decades, the down jacket has become a staple of winter fashion. Bright neon colored versions of the puffer were worn in Italy throughout the 1980s.

During the 1990s the jacket surged in popularity as a young generation of ravers would adorn themselves in the puffer, wearing it throughout the night during the winter months.  A similar trend was witnessed in the United States throughout the 1990s and into the early 2000s, during which popular hip-hop artists began dressing themselves in the large jackets.

Designers and fashion influencers of 2020 reject cropped, bright-colored versions of the jacket, opting instead for a longer, knee-length layer with subtle shades beige. Influencers continue to praise the garment for its ability to work with every outfit occasion.  A recent surge in 1990s continues to help the jacket dominate. Pop culture reflects this trend as hip-hop artists like Kanye West and Drake may both be seen wearing the garment in recent music videos.

Gallery

See also 

 Mountaineering equipment
 Trench coat

References

External links 
 

Jackets
Australian inventions
Australian fashion
Australian clothing